
This is a list of players who graduated from the Nike Tour in 1999. The top 15 players on the Nike Tour's money list in 1999 earned their PGA Tour card for 2000.

*PGA Tour rookie for 2000.

T = Tied
Green background indicates the player retained his PGA Tour card for 2001 (finished inside the top 125).
Red background indicates the player did not retain his PGA Tour card for 2001 (finished outside the top 150).

Runners-up on the PGA Tour in 2000

See also
1999 PGA Tour Qualifying School graduates

References
Money list

Korn Ferry Tour
PGA Tour
Nike Tour graduates
Nike Tour graduates